Seed cake may refer to: 

 Bush bread
 Caraway seed cake
 Press cake, residue left after pressing seeds to extract oil.